A list of notable mathematicians from Italy by century:

12th–15th centuries

12th century
Plato Tiburtinus

13th century
Guido Bonatti
Campano da Novara
Leonardo Fibonacci

14th century
Paolo dell'Abbaco
Giovanni di Gherardo da Prato

15th century
Leon Battista Alberti
Piero Borgi
Leonardo da Vinci
Scipione del Ferro
Giovanni di Gherardo da Prato
Luca Pacioli
Piero della Francesca
Paolo dal Pozzo Toscanelli
Antonio Tucci Manetti

16th century

A
 Camillo Agrippa
 Andrea Argoli

B
 Bernardino Baldi
 Francesco Barozzi
 Giambattista Benedetti
 Rutilio Benincasa
 Giuseppe Biancani
 Rafael Bombelli

C
 Girolamo Cardano
 Pietro Antonio Cataldi
 Bonaventura Cavalieri
 Federico Commandino

D
 Ignazio Danti
Guidobaldo del Monte

F
 Lodovico Ferrari
 Scipione del Ferro

G
 Galileo Galilei
 Luca Gaurico
 Marino Ghetaldi
 Orazio Grassi

M
 Giovanni Antonio Magini
 Francesco Maurolico
 Fabrizio Mordente

R
 Matteo Ricci
 Ostilio Ricci

S
 Giuseppe Scala

T
 Niccolò Tartaglia
 Gianello Torriani

V
 Luca Valerio

17th century

A
 Niccolò Aggiunti
 Giulio Aleni
 Andrea Argoli

B
 Giovanni Battista Baliani
 Rutilio Benincasa
 Mario Bettini
 Giuseppe Biancani
 Giovanni Alfonso Borelli
 Giovanni Antonio Borrelli
 Tito Livio Burattini

C
 Gregorio Caloprese
 Paolo Casati
 Giovanni Cassini
 Benedetto Castelli
 Pietro Antonio Cataldi
 Bonaventura Cavalieri
 Giovanni Ceva
 Tommaso Ceva

 Giovanni Giustino Ciampini
 Elena Lucrezia Cornaro
 Tommaso Cornelio

F
 Michelangelo Fardella

G
 Galileo Galilei
 Marino Ghetaldi
 Vitale Giordano
 Domenico Guglielmini

L
 Francesco Lana de Terzi

M
Eustachio Manfredi
Gabriele Manfredi
Alessandro Marchetti
Pietro Mengoli
Geminiano Montanari

P
 Onofrio Puglisi

R
 Jacopo Riccati
 Matteo Ricci
 Michelangelo Ricci

S
 Giovanni Girolamo Saccheri
 Antonio Schinella Conti

T
 Evangelista Torricelli

V
 Vincenzo Viviani

Z
 Giovanni Battista Zupi

18th century

A
 Pietro Abbati Marescotti
 Maria Gaetana Agnesi
 Giovanni Battista Amici
 Agostino Ariani
 Giuseppe Avanzini

B
 Matteo Barbieri
 Laura Bassi
 Gabriele Bonomo
 Orazio Borgondio
 Ruggiero Giuseppe Boscovich
 Vincenzo Brunacci

C
 Antonio Caccianino
 Antonio Cagnoli
 Giuseppe Calandrelli
 Gregorio Caloprese
 Sebastiano Canterzani
 Francesco Cetti
 Giovanni Ceva
 Tommaso Ceva
 Antonio Collalto
 Domenico Corradi d'Austria
 Odoardo Corsini
 Pietro Cossali
 Giovanni Francesco Crivelli

D
 Vincenzo De Filippis

F
 Giovanni Fagnano dei Toschi
 Giulio Fagnano dei Toschi
 Michelangelo Fardella
 Nicola Fergola
 Vittorio Fossombroni
 Paolo Frisi

G
 Annibale Giordano
 Vitale Giordano
 Luigi Guido Grandi
 Domenico Guglielmini

J
 Antonio Maria Jaci

L
 Joseph-Louis Lagrange
 Giovanni Antonio Lecchi
 Antonio Maria Lorgna

M
 Gianfrancesco Malfatti
 Eustachio Manfredi
 Gabriele Manfredi
 Lorenzo Mascheroni
 Marco Mastrofini

O
 Giammaria Ortes

P
 Gioacchino Pessuti
 Giovanni Poleni

R
 Carlo Andrea Rana
 Giordano Riccati
 Jacopo Riccati
 Vincenzo Riccati
 Paolo Ruffini

S
 Giovanni Girolamo Saccheri
 Giovanni Francesco Salvemini
 Antonio Schinella Conti
 Simone Stratico

V
 Domenico Vandelli
 Francesco Vandelli

19th century

A
 Pietro Abbati Marescotti
 Achille Sannia
 Cataldo Agostinelli
 Cesare Aimonetti
 Rosario Alagna
 Cristoforo Alasia
 Giacomo Albanese
 Giuseppe Albeggiani
 Alberto Alessio
 Emilio Almansi
 Ugo Amaldi
 Domenico Amanzio
 Enrico Amaturo
 Giovanni Battista Amici
 Federico Amodeo
 Luigi Amoroso
 Giovanni Antonelli
 Michele Araldi
 Angelo Armenante
 Cesare Arzelà
 Ferdinando Aschieri
 Giulio Ascoli
 Giuseppe Avanzini
 Mattia Azzarelli

B
 Giuseppe Bardelli
 Pacifico Barilari
 Giuseppe Barilli
 Giovanni Barsotti
 Anselmo Bassani
 Giuseppe Basso
 Giuseppe Battaglini
 Giacomo Bellacchi
 Giusto Bellavitis
 Giuseppe Belli
 Serafino Belli
 Eugenio Beltrami
 Timoteo Bertelli
 Eugenio Bertini
 Luigi Berzolari
 Davide Besso
 Rodolfo Bettazzia
 Enrico Betti
 Luigi Bianchi
 Giorgio Bidone
 Pietro Blaserna
 Carlo Bonacini
 Baldassarre Boncompagni
 Giovanni Bordiga
 Antonio Maria Bordoni
 Ettore Bortolotti
 Francesco Brioschi
 Vincenzo Brunacci
 Giuseppe Bruno
 Cesare Burali-Forti
 Pietro Burgatti

C
 Antonio Caccianino
 Giuseppe Calandrelli
 Alfredo Capelli
 Ernesto Capocci di Belmonte
 Ettore Caporali
 Francesco Carlini
 Felice Casorati (mathematician)
 Filiberto Castellano
 Guido Castelnuovo
 Carlo Alberto Castigliano
 Sebastiano Catania
 Tito Camillo Cazzaniga
 Francesco Cecioni
 Vincenzo Cerulli
 Ernesto Cesàro
 Mineo Chini
 Felice Chiò

 Edgardo Ciani
 Domenico Cipolletti
 Giuseppe Ciscato
 Delfino Codazzi
 Ottavio Colecchi
 Antonio Collalto
 Annibale Comessatti
 Francesco Contarino
 Filippo Corridi
 Luigi Cremona
 Antonio Cua

D
 Enrico D'Ovidio
 Ugo Dainelli
 Enrico De Amicis
 Giovanni De Berardinis
 Annibale De Gasparis
 Riccardo De Paolis
 Vincenzo De Rossi Re
 Antonio De Zolt
 Guelfo Del Prete
 Alfonso Del Re
 Ercole Dembowski
 Alfonso Di Legge
 Giovanni Di Pirro
 Ulisse Dini
 Giovanni Battista Donati
 Luigi Donati
 Alessandro Dorna
 Enrico Ducci

F
 Francesco Faà di Bruno
 Aureliano Faifofer
 Antonio Fais
 Giovanni Taddeo Farini
 Gaetano Fazzari
 Emanuele Fergola
 Nicola Fergola
 Gaspare Stanislao Ferrari
 Camillo Ferrati
 Annibale Ferrero
 Cesare Finzi
 Vincenzo Flauti
 Francesco Flores D'Arcais
 Vittorio Fossombroni
 Giovanni Frattini

G
 Michele Gebbia
 Angelo Genocchi
 Annibale Giordano
 Gaetano Giorgini
 Giuseppe Bruno
 Carlo Ignazio Giulio
 Paolo Gorini
 Maria Gramegna

L
 Giuseppe Lauricella
 Giovanni Maria Lavagna
 Tullio Levi-Civita
 Guglielmo Libri Carucci dalla Sommaja
 Gino Loria

M
 Gian Antonio Maggi
 Roberto Marcolongo
 Marco Mastrofini
 Luigi Federico Menabrea
 Serafino Rafaele Minich
 Giacinto Morera
 Ottaviano Fabrizio Mossotti

N
 Angiolo Nardi Dei

O
 Barnaba Oriani

P
 Ernesto Padova
 Ernesto Pascal
 Giuseppe Peano
 Mario Pieri
 Salvatore Pincherle
 Gabrio Piola
 Giovanni Antonio Amedeo Plana
 Luigi Poletti
 Sebastiano Purgotti

R
 Michele Rajna
 Gregorio Ricci-Curbastro
 Raffaele Rubini
 Paolo Ruffini

S
 Leonardo Salimbeni
 Agatino San Martino Pardo
 Giovanni Santini
 Umberto Scarpis
 Corrado Segre
 Quintino Sella
 Francesco Siacci
 Simone Stratico

T
Barnaba Tortolini 
 Virgilio Trettenero
 Domenico Turazza

V
 Giovanni Vailati
 Adolfo Venturi
 Giuseppe Veronese
 Giulio Vivanti
 Vito Volterra

Z
 Michele Zannotti
 Giuseppe Zurria

20th century

A
 Cataldo Agostinelli
 Amedeo Agostini
 Cesare Aimonetti
 Rosario Alagna
 Cristoforo Alasia
 Giacomo Albanese
 Maria Ales
 Alberto Alessio
 Emilio Almansi
 Ugo Amaldi (1875-1957)
 Vincenzo Amato (mathematician)
 Enrico Amaturo
 Luigi Amerio
 Federico Amodeo
 Luigi Amoroso
 Giulio Andreoli
 Aldo Andreotti (1924-1980)
 Enrico Arbarello (1945-)
 Gino Arrighi
 Emilio Artom
 Cesare Arzelà
 Enrico Ascione
 Guido Ascoli
 Salvatore Aurino
 Giuseppe Avondo Bodino

B
 Giuseppe Bagnera
 Emilio Baiada
 Mario Baldassarri (mathematician)
 Silvio Ballarin
 Ubaldo Barbieri
 Ugo Barbuti
 Giulio Cesare Barozzi
 Jacopo Barsotti
 Umberto Bartocci
 Giuseppe Bartolozzi
 Antonio Beccarelli
 Alberto Maria Bedarida
 Giacomo Bellacchi
 Margherita Beloch Piazzolla
 Azeglio Bemporad
 Giulio Bemporad
 Alberto Beneduce (1877–1944) 
 Vladimiro Bernstein (1900-1936)
 Eugenio Bertini
 Luigi Berzolari
 Rodolfo Bettazzi
 Emilio Bianchi (mathematician)
 Luigi Bianchi
 Giuseppina Masotti Biggiogero
 Giulio Bisconcini
 Pietro Blaserna
 Giovanni Boaga
 Tommaso Boggio
 Enrico Boggio Lera
 Corrado Böhm
 Enrico Bombieri (1940-)
 Enrico Bompiani
 Carlo Bonacini
 Colombo Bonaparte
 Carlo Emilio Bonferroni
 Giovanni Bordiga
 Agostino Borio
 Mario Boriosi
 Enea Bortolotti
 Ettore Bortolotti
 Giovanni Bottino Barzizza
 Franco Brezzi (1945-)
 Andrea Brigaglia
 Ugo Napoleone Giuseppe Broggi
 Luigi Brusotti
 Cesare Burali-Forti
 Pietro Burgatti
 Filippo Burzio
 Pietro Buzano

C
 Angelina Cabras
 Renato Caccioppoli
 Federico Cafiero
 Eugenio Calabi (1923-)
 Pasquale Calapso
 Renato Calapso
 Bruto Caldonazzo
 Domenico Caligo
 Luigi Campedelli
 Giacomo Candido
 Francesco Paolo Cantelli
 Alfredo Capelli
 Milvio Capovani

 Luigi Carnera
 Gino Cassinis
 Emma Castelnuovo
 Guido Castelnuovo
 Sebastiano Catania
 Carlo Cattaneo (mathematician)
 Francesco Cecioni
 Carlo Cercignani (1939-2010)
 Vincenzo Cerulli
 Lamberto Cesari (1910-1990)
 Mineo Chini
 Oscar Chisini
 Edgardo Ciani
 Michele Cipolla
 Giuseppe Colombo
 Gustavo Colonnetti
 Paul G. Comba
 Annibale Comessatti
 Caterina Consani
 Francesco Contarino
 Alberto Conti
 Roberto Conti (mathematician) (1923-2006)
 Eugenio Curiel

D
 Enrico D'Ovidio
 Luigi Sante Da Rios
 Vittorio Dalla Volta
 Gabriele Darbo
 Enrico De Amicis
 Giovanni De Berardinis
 Corrado De Concini (1949-)
 Michele De Franchis
 Ennio De Giorgi (1928-1996)
 Luciano De Simon
 Antonio De Zolt
 Gabriella Del Grosso
 Pasquale del Pezzo
 Alfonso Del Re
 Ettore Del Vecchio
 Alfonso Di Legge
 Giovanni Di Pirro
 Ulisse Dini (1845-1918)
 Luigi Donati
 Paolo Dore
 Enrico Ducci

E
 Renato Einaudi
 Federigo Enriques (1871-1946)

F
 Alessandro Faedo
 Antonio Fais
 Gino Fano
 Luigi Fantappiè
 Antonio Favaro
 Gaetano Fazzari
 Urbano Federighi
 Giorgio Ferrarese
 Giuseppe Ferrario
 Gaetano Fichera (1922-1996)
 Alessandro Figà Talamanca
 Bruno de Finetti (1906-1985)
 Aldo Finzi (mathematician)
 Bruno Finzi
 Francesco Flores D'Arcais
 Mauro Francaviglia (1953-2013)
 Giovanni Frattini
 Guido Fubini

G
 Giovanni Gallavotti (1941-)
 Dionigi Galletto
 Adriano Garsia
 Michele Gebbia

 Ludovico Geymonat
 Corrado Gini
 Maria Gramegna

K
 Giulio Krall

L
 Ernesto Laura
 Orazio Lazzarino
 Beppo Levi
 Eugenio Elia Levi
 Tullio Levi-Civita
 Gino Loria

M
 Enrico Magenes (1923-2010)
 Gian Antonio Maggi
 Carlo Felice Manara
 Ermanno Marchionna
 Roberto Marcolongo
 Carlo Miranda (1912-1982)
 Mario Miranda (1937-)
 Ugo Morin

N
 Pia Nalli

O
 Piergiorgio Odifreddi (1950-)
 Adalberto Orsatti

P
 Alessandro Padoa
 Attilio Palatini
 Ernesto Pascal
 Giuseppe Peano
 Mauro Picone (1885-1977)
 Mario Pieri
 Salvatore Pincherle (1853-1936)
 Tina Pizzardo (1903-1989)
 Luigi Poletti
 Giuseppe Pompilj (1913-1968)
 Claudio Procesi (1941-)
 Giovanni Prodi (1925-2010)

Q
 Alfio Quarteroni (1952-)

R
 Giulio Racah
 Lucio Lombardo Radice
 Michele Rajna
 Tullio Regge
 Arturo Reghini
 Gregorio Ricci-Curbastro (1853-1925)
 Gian-Carlo Rota (1932-1999)
 Lucio Russo

S
Nicola Salvatore Dino
Giovanni Sansone (1888-1979)
Umberto Scarpis
Gaetano Scorza (1876-1939)
Beniamino Segre (1903-1977)
Corrado Segre
Francesco Severi
Antonio Signorini
Emilio Spedicato
Franco Spisani
Guido Stampacchia

T
Eugenio Giuseppe Togliatti
Leonida Tonelli
Francesco Giacomo Tricomi

V
Giovanni Vacca
Edoardo Vesentini
Giuseppe Vitali
Giulio Vivanti
Vito Volterra

Z
 Giuseppe Zwirner

 
Mathematicians
Italian